Wilfred Edward Salter Owen MC (18 March 1893 – 4 November 1918) was an English poet and soldier. He was one of the leading poets of the First World War. His war poetry on the horrors of trenches and gas warfare was much influenced by his mentor Siegfried Sassoon and stood in contrast to the public perception of war at the time and to the confidently patriotic verse written by earlier war poets such as Rupert Brooke. Among his best-known works – most of which were published posthumously – are "Dulce et Decorum est", "Insensibility", "Anthem for Doomed Youth", "Futility", "Spring Offensive" and "Strange Meeting". Owen was killed in action on 4 November 1918, a week before the war's end,  at the age of 25.

Early life
Owen was born on 18 March 1893 at Plas Wilmot, a house in Weston Lane, near Oswestry in Shropshire. He was the eldest of Thomas and (Harriett) Susan Owen (née Shaw)'s four children; his siblings were Mary Millard, (William) Harold, and Colin Shaw Owen. When Wilfred was born, his parents lived in a comfortable house owned by his grandfather, Edward Shaw.

After Edward's death in January 1897, and the house's sale in March, the family lodged in the back streets of Birkenhead. There Thomas Owen temporarily worked in the town employed by a railway company.  Thomas transferred to Shrewsbury in April 1897 where the family lived with Thomas' parents in Canon Street.

Thomas Owen transferred back to Birkenhead in 1898 when he became stationmaster at Woodside station. The family lived with him at three successive homes in the Tranmere district area of the town. They then moved back to Shrewsbury in 1907. Wilfred Owen was educated at the Birkenhead Institute and at Shrewsbury Technical School (later known as the Wakeman School).

Owen discovered his poetic vocation in about 1904 during a holiday spent in Cheshire. He was raised as an Anglican of the evangelical type, and in his youth was a devout believer, in part thanks to his strong relationship with his mother, which lasted throughout his life. His early influences included the Bible and the Romantic poets, particularly Wordsworth and John Keats.

Owen's last two years of formal education saw him as a pupil-teacher at the Wyle Cop school in Shrewsbury. In 1911 he passed the matriculation exam for the University of London, but not with the first-class honours needed for a scholarship, which in his family's circumstances was the only way he could have afforded to attend.

In return for free lodging, and some tuition for the entrance exam (this has been questioned) Owen worked as lay assistant to the Vicar of Dunsden near Reading, living in the vicarage from September 1911 to February 1913. During this time he attended classes at University College, Reading (now the University of Reading), in botany and later, at the urging of the head of the English Department, took free lessons in Old English. His time spent at Dunsden parish led him to disillusionment with the Church, both in its ceremony and its failure to provide aid for those in need.

From 1913 he worked as a private tutor teaching English and French at the Berlitz School of Languages in Bordeaux, France, and later with a family. There he met the older French poet Laurent Tailhade, with whom he later corresponded in French. When war broke out, Owen did not rush to enlist – and even considered joining the French army – but eventually returned to England.

War service
On 21 October 1915, he enlisted in the Artists Rifles. For the next seven months, he trained at Hare Hall Camp in Essex. On 4 June 1916, he was commissioned as a second lieutenant (on probation) in the Manchester Regiment. Initially Owen held his troops in contempt for their loutish behaviour, and in a letter to his mother described his company as "expressionless lumps". However, his imaginative existence was to be changed dramatically by a number of traumatic experiences. He fell into a shell hole and suffered concussion; he was caught in the blast of a trench mortar shell and spent several days unconscious on an embankment lying amongst the remains of one of his fellow officers. Soon afterward, Owen was diagnosed with neurasthenia or shell shock and sent to Craiglockhart War Hospital in Edinburgh for treatment. It was while recuperating at Craiglockhart that he met fellow poet Siegfried Sassoon, an encounter that was to transform Owen's life.

Whilst at Craiglockhart he made friends in Edinburgh's artistic and literary circles, and did some teaching at the Tynecastle High School, in a poor area of the city. In November he was discharged from Craiglockhart, judged fit for light regimental duties. He spent a contented and fruitful winter in Scarborough, North Yorkshire, and in March 1918 was posted to the Northern Command Depot at Ripon. While in Ripon he composed or revised a number of poems, including "Futility" and "Strange Meeting". His 25th birthday was spent quietly at Ripon Cathedral, which is dedicated to his namesake, St. Wilfrid of Hexham.

Owen returned in July 1918, to active service in France, although he might have stayed on home-duty indefinitely. His decision to return was probably the result of Sassoon's being sent back to England, after being shot in the head in an apparent "friendly fire" incident, and put on sick-leave for the remaining duration of the war. Owen saw it as his duty to add his voice to that of Sassoon, that the horrific realities of the war might continue to be told. Sassoon was violently opposed to the idea of Owen returning to the trenches, threatening to "stab [him] in the leg" if he tried it. Aware of his attitude, Owen did not inform him of his action until he was once again in France.

At the very end of August 1918, Owen returned to the front line – perhaps imitating Sassoon's example. On 1 October 1918, Owen led units of the Second Manchesters to storm a number of enemy strong points near the village of Joncourt. For his courage and leadership in the Joncourt action, he was awarded the Military Cross, an award he had always sought in order to justify himself as a war poet, but the award was not gazetted until 15 February 1919. The citation followed on 30 July 1919:

Death

Owen was killed in action on 4 November 1918 during the crossing of the Sambre–Oise Canal, exactly one week (almost to the hour) before the signing of the Armistice which ended the war, and was promoted to the rank of Lieutenant the day after his death. His mother received the telegram informing her of his death on Armistice Day, as the church bells in Shrewsbury were ringing out in celebration. Owen is buried at Ors Communal Cemetery, Ors, in northern France. The inscription on his gravestone, chosen by his mother Susan, is a quotation from his poetry: "SHALL LIFE RENEW THESE BODIES? OF A TRUTH ALL DEATH WILL HE ANNUL" W.O.

Poetry

Owen is regarded by many as the greatest poet of the First World War, known for his verse about the horrors of trench and gas warfare. He had been writing poetry for some years before the war, himself dating his poetic beginnings to a stay at Broxton by the Hill when he was ten years old.

The poetry of William Butler Yeats was a significant influence for Owen, but Yeats did not reciprocate Owen's admiration, excluding him from The Oxford Book of Modern Verse, a decision Yeats later defended, saying Owen was "all blood, dirt, and sucked sugar stick" and "unworthy of the poet's corner of a country newspaper". Yeats elaborated: "In all the great tragedies, tragedy is a joy to the man who dies ... If war is necessary in our time and place, it is best to forget its suffering as we do the discomfort of fever ..."

The Romantic poets Keats and Shelley influenced much of his early writing and poetry. His great friend, the poet Siegfried Sassoon, later had a profound effect on his poetic voice, and Owen's most famous poems ("Dulce et Decorum est" and "Anthem for Doomed Youth") show direct results of Sassoon's influence. Manuscript copies of the poems survive, annotated in Sassoon's handwriting. Owen's poetry would eventually be more widely acclaimed than that of his mentor. While his use of pararhyme with heavy reliance on assonance was innovative, he was not the only poet at the time to use these particular techniques. He was, however, one of the first to experiment with it extensively.

His poetry itself underwent significant changes in 1917. As a part of his therapy at Craiglockhart, Owen's doctor, Arthur Brock, encouraged Owen to translate his experiences, specifically the experiences he relived in his dreams, into poetry. Sassoon, who was becoming influenced by Freudian psychoanalysis, aided him here, showing Owen through example what poetry could do. Sassoon's use of satire influenced Owen, who tried his hand at writing "in Sassoon's style". Further, the content of Owen's verse was undeniably changed by his work with Sassoon. Sassoon's emphasis on realism and "writing from experience" was contrary to Owen's hitherto romantic-influenced style, as seen in his earlier sonnets. Owen was to take both Sassoon's gritty realism and his own romantic notions and create a poetic synthesis that was both potent and sympathetic, as summarised by his famous phrase "the pity of war". In this way, Owen's poetry is quite distinctive, and he is, by many, considered a greater poet than Sassoon. Nonetheless, Sassoon contributed to Owen's popularity by his strong promotion of his poetry, both before and after Owen's death, and his editing was instrumental in the making of Owen as a poet.

Owen's poems had the benefit of strong patronage, and it was a combination of Sassoon's influence, support from Edith Sitwell, and the preparation of a new and fuller edition of the poems in 1931 by Edmund Blunden that ensured his popularity, coupled with a revival of interest in his poetry in the 1960s which plucked him out of a relatively exclusive readership into the public eye. Though he had plans for a volume of verse, for which he had written a "Preface", he never saw his own work published apart from those poems he included in The Hydra, the magazine he edited at Craiglockhart War Hospital, and "Miners", which was published in The Nation.

There were many other influences on Owen's poetry, including his mother. His letters to her provide an insight into Owen's life at the front, and the development of his philosophy regarding the war. Graphic details of the horror Owen witnessed were never spared. Owen's experiences with religion also heavily influenced his poetry, notably in poems such as "Anthem for Doomed Youth", in which the ceremony of a funeral is re-enacted not in a church, but on the battlefield itself, and "At a Calvary near the Ancre", which comments on the Crucifixion of Christ. Owen's experiences in war led him further to challenge his religious beliefs, claiming in his poem "Exposure" that "love of God seems dying".

Only five of Owen's poems were published before his death, one in fragmentary form. His best known poems include "Anthem for Doomed Youth", "Futility", "Dulce Et Decorum Est", "The Parable of the Old Men and the Young" and "Strange Meeting".
However, most of them were published posthumously: Poems (1920),The Poems of Wilfred Owen (1931),The Collected Poems of Wilfred Owen (1963),The Complete Poems and Fragments (1983); fundamental in this last collection is the poem Soldier's Dream, that deals with Owen's conception of war.

Owen's full unexpurgated opus is in the academic two-volume work The Complete Poems and Fragments (1994) by Jon Stallworthy. Many of his poems have never been published in popular form.

In 1975 Mrs. Harold Owen, Wilfred's sister-in-law, donated all of the manuscripts, photographs and letters which her late husband had owned to the University of Oxford's English Faculty Library. As well as the personal artifacts, this also includes all of Owen's personal library and an almost complete set of The Hydra – the magazine of Craiglockhart War Hospital. These can be accessed by any member of the public on application in advance to the English Faculty librarian.

The Harry Ransom Humanities Research Center at the University of Texas at Austin holds a large collection of Owen's family correspondence.

Relationship with Sassoon
Owen held Siegfried Sassoon in an esteem not far from hero-worship, remarking to his mother that he was "not worthy to light [Sassoon's] pipe". The relationship clearly had a profound impact on Owen, who wrote in his first letter to Sassoon after leaving Craiglockhart "You have fixed my life – however short". Sassoon wrote that he took "an instinctive liking to him", and recalled their time together "with affection". On the evening of 3 November 1917 they parted, Owen having been discharged from Craiglockhart. He was stationed on home-duty in Scarborough for several months, during which time he associated with members of the artistic circle into which Sassoon had introduced him, which included Robbie Ross and Robert Graves. He also met H. G. Wells and Arnold Bennett, and it was during this period he developed the stylistic voice for which he is now recognised. Many of his early poems were penned while stationed at the Clarence Garden Hotel, now the Clifton Hotel in Scarborough's North Bay. A blue tourist plaque on the hotel marks its association with Owen.

Sassoon and Owen kept in touch through correspondence, and after Sassoon was shot in the head in July 1918 and sent back to the UK to recover, they met in August and spent what Sassoon described as "the whole of a hot cloudless afternoon together." They never saw each other again. About three weeks later, Owen wrote to bid Sassoon farewell, as he was on the way back to France, and they continued to communicate. After the Armistice, Sassoon waited in vain for word from Owen, only to be told of his death several months later. The loss grieved Sassoon greatly, and he was never "able to accept that disappearance philosophically." Many years later, he is said, snobbishly, to have told Stephen Spender that he found Owen's grammar school accent "embarrassing". However, in his own account of his friendship with Owen, which appeared in his 1945 autobiography, Siegfried's Journey, Sassoon conjures up a clear picture of Owen's personality, and writes with great tenderness of the time they spent together. Calling Owen's death "a chasm in my private existence", Sassoon expressed regret at what he regarded as his "slowness in discovering that [Owen] was to be of high significance for me, both as a poet and friend...and there was much comfort in his companionship".

Sexuality
Though it has been suggested that Owen hoped to marry Albertina Dauthieu, at the time living in Milnathort, Scotland, had he survived the war, Robert Graves and Sacheverell Sitwell, both of whom knew him, believed that Owen was homosexual, and that homoeroticism was a central element in much of his poetry. Through Sassoon, Owen was introduced to a sophisticated homosexual literary circle which included Oscar Wilde's friend Robbie Ross, writer and poet Osbert Sitwell, and Scottish writer C. K. Scott Moncrieff, the translator of Marcel Proust. This contact, it is argued, broadened Owen's outlook, and increased his confidence in incorporating homoerotic elements into his work. Historians have debated whether Owen had an affair with Scott Moncrieff in May 1918; the latter had dedicated various works to a "Mr W.O.", but Owen never responded.

Throughout Owen's lifetime and for decades after, homosexual activity between men was a punishable offence throughout the United Kingdom, and the account of Owen's sexual development has been somewhat obscured because his brother Harold removed what he considered discreditable passages in Owen's letters and diaries after the death of their mother. Andrew Motion wrote of Owen's relationship with Sassoon: "On the one hand, Sassoon's wealth, posh connections and aristocratic manner appealed to the snob in Owen: on the other, Sassoon's homosexuality admitted Owen to a style of living and thinking that he found naturally sympathetic."
 Sassoon, by his own account, was not actively homosexual at this time, but began his first love affair just after the war ended, in November 1918.

An important turning point in Owen scholarship occurred in 1987 when the New Statesman published "The Truth Untold" by Jonathan Cutbill, the literary executor of Edward Carpenter, which attacked the academic suppression of Owen as a poet of homosexual experience. Amongst the article's contentions was that the poem "Shadwell Stair", previously alleged to be mysterious, was a straightforward elegy to homosexual soliciting in an area of the London docks once renowned for it. In June 2022 the poem was included in the anthology, "100 Queer Poems," compiled by Andrew McMillan and Mary Jean Chan.

Memory
There are memorials to Owen at Gailly, Ors, Oswestry, Birkenhead (Central Library) and Shrewsbury.

On 11 November 1985, Owen was one of the 16 Great War poets commemorated on a slate stone unveiled in Westminster Abbey's Poet's Corner. The inscription on the stone is taken from Owen's "Preface" to his poems: "My subject is War, and the pity of War. The Poetry is in the pity." There is also a small museum at the Craiglockhart War Hospital, now a Napier University building, containing the "War Poets Collection".

The forester's house in Ors where Owen spent his last night, Maison forestière de l'Ermitage, has been transformed by Turner Prize nominee Simon Patterson into an art installation and permanent memorial to Owen and his poetry, which opened to the public on 1 October 2011.

Susan Owen's letter to Rabindranath Tagore marked, Shrewsbury, 1 August 1920, reads: "I have been trying to find courage to write to you ever since I heard that you were in London – but the desire to tell you something is finding its way into this letter today. The letter may never reach you, for I do not know how to address it, tho' I feel sure your name upon the envelope will be sufficient. It is nearly two years ago, that my dear eldest son went out to the War for the last time and the day he said goodbye to me – we were looking together across the sun-glorified sea – looking towards France, with breaking hearts – when he, my poet son, said those wonderful words of yours – beginning at 'When I go from hence, let this be my parting word' – and when his pocket book came back to me – I found these words written in his dear writing – with your name beneath."

Wilfred Owen Association
To commemorate Wilfred's life and poetry, The Wilfred Owen Association was formed in 1989. Since its formation the Association has established permanent public memorials in Shrewsbury and Oswestry. In addition to readings, talks, visits and performances, it promotes and encourages exhibitions, conferences, awareness and appreciation of Owen's poetry. Peter Owen, Wilfred Owen's nephew, was President of the Association until his death in July 2018. The Association's Patrons, listed in the same order as on the Association's website, are Peter Florence, Helen McPhail, Philip Guest, Dr Rowan Williams (Archbishop of Canterbury 2002–2012) and Sir Daniel Day-Lewis; Grey Ruthven, 2nd Earl of Gowrie (1939–2021) was also a Patron. The Association presents a biennial Poetry Award to honour a poet for a sustained body of work that includes memorable war poems; previous recipients include Sir Andrew Motion (Poet Laureate 1999–2009), Dannie Abse, Christopher Logue, Gillian Clarke and Seamus Heaney. Owen Sheers was awarded the prize in September 2018. In November 2015, actor Jason Isaacs unveiled a tribute to Owen at the former Craiglockhart War Hospital in Edinburgh where Owen was treated for shell shock during WWI.

Depictions in popular culture

In literature and films
Stephen MacDonald's play, Not About Heroes, first performed in 1982, takes as its subject matter the friendship between Owen and Sassoon, and begins with their meeting at Craiglockhart during World War I.

Pat Barker's historical novel, Regeneration (1991), describes the meeting and relationship between Sassoon and Owen, acknowledging that, from Sassoon's perspective, the meeting had a profoundly significant effect on Owen. Owen's treatment with his own doctor, Arthur Brock, is also touched upon briefly. Owen's death is described in the third book of Barker's Regeneration trilogy, The Ghost Road (1995). In the 1997 film Regeneration, Stuart Bunce played Owen.

Owen is the subject of the BBC docudrama Wilfred Owen: A Remembrance Tale (2007), in which he is played by Samuel Barnett.

Owen was mentioned as a source of inspiration for one of the correspondents in the epistolary novel, The Guernsey Literary and Potato Peel Pie Society (2008), by Mary Ann Shaffer and Annie Barrows.

In Harry Turtledove's multi-novel Southern Victory Series, the title of the third volume, Walk in Hell, is taken from a line in "Mental Cases". That part of the series is set during an alternate history version of World War I, which sees Canada invaded and occupied by United States troops. On the title page, Owen is acknowledged as the source of the quote.

The Burying Party (2018), depicts Owen's final year, from his time at Craiglockhart Hospital up to the Battle of the Sambre (1918). Matthew Staite stars as Owen and Joyce Branagh as his mother Susan.

Owen, portrayed by Matthew Tennyson, and his friendship with Siegfried Sassoon (Jack Lowden), are depicted in Benediction, a 2021 biographical-drama film, directed by Terence Davies.

In music
His poetry has been reworked into various formats. For example, Benjamin Britten incorporated eight of Owen's poems into his War Requiem, along with words from the Latin Mass for the Dead (Missa pro Defunctis). The Requiem was commissioned for the reconsecration of Coventry Cathedral and first performed there on 30 May 1962. Derek Jarman adapted it for the screen in 1988, with the 1963 recording as the soundtrack.

The Ravishing Beauties recorded Owen's poem "Futility" in an April 1982 John Peel session.

Also in 1982, 10,000 Maniacs recorded a song titled "Anthem for Doomed Youth", loosely based on the poem, in Fredonia, New York. The recording appeared on their first EP release Human Conflict Number Five and later on the compilation Hope Chest. Also appearing on the Hope Chest album was the song "The Latin One", a reference to the title of Owen's poem "Dulce et Decorum Est" on which the song is based.

Additionally in 1982, singer Virginia Astley set the poem "Futility" to music she had composed.

In 1992, Anathema released The Crestfallen EP, with the song "They Die" quoting lines from Owen's poem "The End", which also formed the epitaph on his grave in Ors.

Rudimentary Peni issued their single "Wilfred Owen the Chances" in 2009. The lyrics are from Owen's poem, "The Chances".

Wirral musician Dean Johnson created the musical Bullets and Daffodils, based on music set to Owen's poetry, in 2010.

In 2015, the British indie rock band, The Libertines, released an album entitled Anthems For Doomed Youth; this featured the track "Anthem for Doomed Youth", named after Owen's poem.

His poetry is sampled multiple times on the 2000 Jedi Mind Tricks album Violent by Design. Producer Stoupe the Enemy of Mankind has been widely acclaimed for his sampling on the album, and inclusion of Owen's poetry.

References

External links

 

 Poems (1920), the posthumous collection by Wilfred Owen with an introduction by Siegfried Sassoon at Internet Archive

 
 
 
 Wilfred Owen profile and poems at Poets.org
 The Wilfred Owen Collection , in The First World War Poetry Digital Archive  by Oxford University
 The Wilfred Owen resource page at warpoetry.co.uk
 Wilfred Owen at BBC Poetry Season
 Wilfred Owen Association
 the Dunsden Owen Association, including a trail app
 Wilfred Owen at the British Library
Finding aid to Wilfred Owen papers at Columbia University. Rare Book & Manuscript Library.

1893 births
1918 deaths
Burials in France
Alumni of the University of Reading
Artists' Rifles soldiers
British Army personnel of World War I
British military personnel killed in World War I
English World War I poets
People with post-traumatic stress disorder
20th-century English male writers
English people of Welsh descent
British gay writers
Manchester Regiment officers
People from Oswestry
Recipients of the Military Cross
War writers
20th-century English poets
English LGBT poets
English male poets
People from Birkenhead
Gay military personnel
Lost Generation writers
20th-century LGBT people
Military personnel from Shropshire